Family Feud  is an American television game show created by Mark Goodson. It features two families who compete to name the most popular answers to survey questions in order to win cash and prizes.

The show has had three separate runs, the first of which started in 1976. Its original run from 1976 to 1985 aired on ABC and in syndication, with Richard Dawson as host. In 1988, the series was revived and aired on both CBS and in syndication with Ray Combs hosting until 1994, with Dawson returning until that version ended in 1995. In 1999, the series was revived through its first-run syndication with four different hosts: Louie Anderson (1999–2002), Richard Karn (2002–2006), John O'Hurley (2006–2010), and Steve Harvey (2010–present). Studio announcers who introduced the contestants and read credits included Gene Wood (1976–1995), Burton Richardson (1999–2010), Joey Fatone (2010–2015), and Rubin Ervin (2015–present).

Within a year of its debut, the original version became the number one game show in daytime television; however, as viewing habits changed, the ratings declined. Harvey becoming host in 2010 increased Nielsen ratings significantly and eventually placed the program among the top three most-popular syndicated television shows in the United States. Harvey has also surpassed every previous host in tenure, although Dawson hosted more episodes of the show.

The program has produced multiple regional adaptations in over 50 international markets outside the United States. Reruns of episodes hosted by Steve Harvey air on Game Show Network, as well as in syndication while reruns of earlier versions air on Buzzr. Aside from television shows, there have been also many home editions produced in board game, interactive film, and video game formats.

Gameplay 
The game features two competing families, each represented by five members (reduced to four contestants for the 1994–95 season), who compete to determine the answers to survey questions. The original version of the show began with the families being introduced, seated opposite each other as if posing for family portraits, after which the host interviewed them.

While there is no minimum age to participate in Family Feud, producers recommend that contestants are 15 years of age or older due to the nature of some questions. Each round begins with a "face-off" question that serves as a toss-up between two opposing contestants. The host asks a survey question that was previously posed to a group of 100 people, such as "Name the hour that you get up on Sunday mornings." A certain number of answers are concealed on the board, ranked by popularity of the survey's responses. Only answers said by at least two people can appear on the board. The first contestant to buzz in gives an answer; if it is the most popular, his/her family immediately wins the face-off. Otherwise, the opponent responds and the family member providing the higher-ranked answer wins. Ties are broken in favor of the contestant who buzzes in first. If neither contestant's answer is on the board, the other eight contestants have a chance to respond, one at a time from alternating sides, until an answer is revealed. The family that wins the face-off may choose to play the question or pass control to their opponents (except on the 1988–95 versions, when the family who won the face-off automatically gained control of the question).

The family with control of the question then tries to win the round by guessing all of the remaining concealed answers, with each member giving one answer in sequence. Giving an incorrect answer, or failing to respond, earns a strike. Three strikes gives their opponents a chance to "steal" the points for the round by guessing any one of the remaining answers. Otherwise, the points are awarded to the family that originally had control. From 1992 to 2003, the value of the "stealing" answer was credited to the "stealing" family. If the opponents are given the opportunity to "steal" the points, then only their team's captain is required to answer the question. For most of the series, this is done after the family confers with each other; the only exception was on the 1988 series where each family member was polled for an answer with the team captain having the option to either select one of the family's answers or give a different answer. Any remaining concealed answers on the board that were not guessed are then revealed.

Answers are worth one point for every person in the 100-member survey who gave them. The winning family in each round scores the total points for all revealed answers to that question, including those given during the face-off but excluding the one used to steal. The number of answers on the board decreases from round to round, and as the game progresses, certain rounds are played for double or triple point value.

For most of the show's existence, the first team to reach or surpass a certain point total won the game. The most common goal has been 300 points but there have been exceptions. When the original series first premiered, the goal was 200 points and for its final year, it was increased to 400 points. From the debut of the original series until 1992, families were awarded $1 per point scored.

From 1999 to 2003, the family with the highest point total after four rounds of play won the game regardless of their score. The first three rounds were played as normal rounds. In the fourth rounds, the point values were tripled, but the families were only allowed one strike if they had control. In the rare instance that the family in control was trailing and could not accumulate enough points to potentially overtake the leaders before striking out, the game ended without the other family attempting to steal.

On the first two series a match continued until a family reached the goal. The current series reinstated the 300 point goal in 2003 but kept the four round format. If neither family has reached 300 points after four rounds, one more triple value question is played as a sudden death face-off. Only the top answer is displayed on the board, and the first contestant to buzz in with it wins the points and the game for their team.

In the original periodic primetime specials, three games were played, with the first two using the $200 format. For the third game, only one question round was played with the winning two celebrity teams from the previous rounds playing.

Fast Money 
At the end of the main game, the winning family selects two members to play the show's bonus round, known as "Fast Money". One contestant is onstage with the host, while the other is sequestered backstage with headphones so as not to hear or see the first portion of the round. The first contestant is asked five rapid-fire survey questions and has a set time limit in which to answer them (originally 15 seconds, extended to 20 in 1994); time begins to run only after the first question is asked, and the first contestant may pass on a question and return to it after all five have been asked, if time remains.

After the first contestant has finished answering or run out of time, he or she is awarded a point for each person in the survey who gave the same response. Once these points are tallied, the board is cleared except for the total score, and the second contestant is then brought out to answer the same five questions. The same rules are followed, but the time limit is extended by five seconds (originally 20, then extended to 25); in addition, if the second contestant duplicates an answer given by the first, a buzzer sounds and he or she must give another answer. The family is awarded $5 for each point. If the two contestants reach a combined total of 200 points or more, the family wins a cash prize.

The cash prize for winning Fast Money has varied. During the ABC and CBS incarnations of the show, the top prize was $5,000, and $10,000 in syndication. In 2001, the prize was doubled to $20,000.

In the original periodic primetime specials, each game was followed by a Fast Money round. The first two were each worth $5,000, and the final one was worth $10,000.

Returning champions 
When Family Feud premiered on ABC, network rules dictated how much a family could win. Once any family reached $25,000, they were retired as champions. The accompanying syndicated series that premiered in 1977 featured two new families each episode because of a then common television syndication practice known as "bicycling" (wherein individual stations sent an episode of a series they had already aired to another station, reducing the number of tapes a syndicator had to send out but also ensuring that stations did not air the same episode of a show the same day, nor were they assured of airing in a proper sequence).

The CBS daytime and syndicated versions which began airing in 1988 also featured returning champions, who could appear for a maximum of five days. For a brief period in the 1994–95 season which aired in syndication, there were no returning champions. For these episodes, two new families competed in this first half of each episode. The second half featured former champion families who appeared on Family Feud between 1976 and 1985, with the winner of the first half of the show playing one of these families in the second half.

In some cases from 1992 to 1995, the returning champions continued until they were defeated. From 1999 to 2002, two new families appeared on each episode. In 2002, returning champions again appeared with the same five-day limit. In 2009, a new car was announced for a family who wins five games in a row.

Bullseye/Bankroll game 
In June 1992, the CBS daytime edition of Feud expanded from 30 to 60 minutes and became known as the Family Feud Challenge. As part of the change, a new round was added at the start of each game called "Bullseye". This round determined the potential Fast Money stake for each team. Each team was given a starting value for their bank and attempted to come up with the top answer to a survey question to add to it. The Bullseye round was added to the syndicated edition in September 1992, which remained 30 minutes and was retitled as the New Family Feud.

The first two members of each family appeared at the face-off podium and were asked a question to which only the number-one answer was available. Giving the top answer added the value for that question to the family's bank. The process then repeated with the four remaining members from each family. On the first half of the daytime version, families were staked with $2,500. The first question was worth $500, with each succeeding question worth $500 more than the previous, with the final question worth $2,500. This allowed for a potential maximum bank of $10,000. For the second half of the daytime version, and also on the syndicated version, all values were doubled, making the maximum potential bank $20,000. The team that eventually won the game played for their bank in Fast Money.

In 1994, with Richard Dawson returning as host, the round's name was changed to the "Bankroll" round. Although the goal remained of giving only the number-one answer, the format was modified to three questions from five, with only one member of each family participating for all three questions. The initial stake for each family remained the same ($2,500 in the first half of the hour and $5,000 in the second). However, the value for each question was $500, $1,500 and $2,500 in the first half, with values doubling for the second half. This meant a potential maximum bank of $7,000 in the first half and $14,000 in the second.

The Bullseye round returned for the 2009–2010 season and was played similarly to the format used from 1992 to 1994 on the syndicated version. Five questions were asked, worth from $1,000 to $5,000. However, each family was given a $15,000 starting stake, which meant a potential maximum of a $30,000 bank.

When Harvey took over as host, the Fast Money jackpot reverted to a flat $20,000.

Hosts and announcers 
When Family Feud was conceived in 1976, Richard Dawson (then a regular panelist on the Goodson–Todman game show Match Game) had a standing agreement with Mark Goodson that when the next Goodson–Todman game show was in the planning stages, Dawson would be given an audition to host it. Dawson had read in trade publications that a pilot for a new show named Family Feud was in the works, and it was originally to be hosted by Star Trek actor William Shatner (although since they were involved in the run-throughs, Geoff Edwards and Jack Narz, the latter of whom reputedly was Goodson's initial choice to host, were under consideration). Incensed, Dawson sent his agent to Goodson to threaten to present an un-funny, silent, and bland persona on future Match Game episodes if he was not given an audition for Feud. Dawson was then selected as host of the original ABC and first syndicated versions of Family Feud. As writer David Marc put it, Dawson's on-air personality "fell somewhere between the brainless sincerity of Wink Martindale and the raunchy cynicism of Chuck Barris". Dawson showed himself to have insistent affections for all of the female members of each family that competed on the show, regardless of age, kissing them, an act that attracted some controversy then among viewers. Writers Tim Brooks, Jon Ellowitz, and Earle F. Marsh attributed Family Feuds popularity to Dawson's "glib familiarity" (he had previously played Newkirk on Hogan's Heroes) and "ready wit" (from his tenure as a panelist on Match Game). The show's original announcer was Gene Wood, with Johnny Gilbert and Rod Roddy serving as occasional substitutes.

In 1988, comedian Ray Combs took over Dawson's role as host on CBS and in syndication with Wood returning as announcer and Roddy and Art James serving in that role when Wood was not available. Combs hosted the program until the daytime version's cancellation in 1993 and the syndicated version until the end of the 1993–94 season. Dawson returned to the show at the request of Mark Goodson Productions for the 1994–95 season.

When Feud returned to syndication in 1999, it was initially hosted by comedian Louie Anderson, with Burton Richardson as the new announcer. In 2002, Richard Karn was selected to take over for Anderson, until he was replaced by John O'Hurley in 2006. In 2010, both O'Hurley and Richardson departed from the show. O'Hurley later stated that he left because he was resistant toward the show's decision to emphasize ribald humor and wanted to keep the show family-friendly. Steve Harvey was later named the new host and began hosting on July 10, 2010. Harvey has been hosting the show ever since. Announcements were made using a pre-recorded track of Joey Fatone's voice, which was used on the show until the end of the 2014–2015 season. Rubin Ervin, who has been a member of the production staff as the warmup man for the audience since Harvey took over, became the announcer at the start of the 2015–2016 season and has retained the role since. 

In 2015, Harvey signed with ABC for the primetime reboot of Celebrity Family Feud, with Burton Richardson returning as announcer. Harvey has hosted Celebrity Family Feud since 2015, while Richardson has announced for Celebrity Family Feud since it began in 2008. Richardson was involved with the NBC version of Celebrity Family Feud in 2008 and has been announcing for the 2015 reboot since its inception.

The first four versions of the show were directed by Paul Alter and produced by Howard Felsher and Cathy Dawson. For the 1988 versions, Gary Dawson worked with the show as a third producer, and Alter was joined by two other directors, Marc Breslow and Andy Felsher. The 1999 version's main staff include executive producer Gabrielle Johnston, co-executive producers Kristin Bjorklund, Brian Hawley and Sara Dansby, and director Ken Fuchs; Johnston and Bjorklund previously worked as associate producers of the 1980s version. The show's classic theme tune was written by an uncredited Walt Levinsky for Score Productions. The theme and cues for the 1994–1995 version was written by Edd Kalehoff and are based on the Walt Levinsky composition. The themes used from 1999 to 2008 were written by John Lewis Parker. The production rights to the show were originally owned by the production company Goodson shared with his partner Bill Todman, but were sold to their current holder, Fremantle, when it acquired all of Goodson and Todman's format catalog in 2002.

Broadcast history

1976–1985 

Mark Goodson created Family Feud during the increasing popularity of his earlier game show, Match Game, which had set daytime ratings records between 1973 and 1976, and on which Dawson appeared almost daily as one of its most popular panelists. Match Game aired on CBS, and by 1976, CBS vice-president Fred Silverman, who had originally commissioned Match Game, had moved to a new position as president of ABC. The show, along with a revised daytime schedule for the summer, was first announced by ABC at an annual meeting in May. The show premiered on ABC's daytime lineup at 1:30 p.m. (ET)/12:30 p.m. (CT/MT/PT) on July 12, 1976. Because it faced the first halves of two long-running and popular soap operas, CBS' As the World Turns and NBC's Days of Our Lives, Feud was not an immediate hit. But a timeslot change several months later made it a ratings winner for ABC, and it eventually surpassed Match Game to become the highest-rated game show on daytime TV.

Due to the expansion of All My Children to one hour in April 1977, the show was moved to 11:30/10:30 a.m., as the second part of an hour that had daytime reruns of Happy Days (later Laverne & Shirley) as its lead-in. When the Dick Clark-hosted $20,000 Pyramid was canceled in June 1980, Feud moved a half-hour back to 12 noon/11:00 a.m. It remained the most popular daytime game show until Merv Griffin's game show Wheel of Fortune, propelled by a new, highly-popular concurrent syndicated evening version, surpassed it in 1984. From May 8, 1978 until May 25, 1984, ABC periodically broadcast hour-long primetime "All-Star Specials", in which celebrity casts from various primetime TV series (mostly ABC ones) competed instead of ordinary families. The popularity of the program inspired Goodson to consider producing a nighttime edition, which launched in syndication on September 19, 1977 with Viacom Enterprises as distributor. Like many other game shows at the time, the nighttime Feud aired once a week; it expanded to twice a week in January 1979, and finally to five nights a week (Monday through Friday) in the fall of 1980, representing the first time that a weekday network game ran concurrently with a nightly syndicated edition. Dawson and Feud coasted for several years at the top, seen twice a day in much of the country. However, the viewing habits of both daytime and syndicated audiences began changing around 1984. When Griffin launched Wheels syndicated version, starring Pat Sajak and Vanna White, in 1983, that show climbed the ratings to the point where it unseated Feud as the highest-rated syndicated show, even replacing it on some stations; the syndicated premiere of Wheels sister show Jeopardy! with Alex Trebek as host also siphoned ratings from Feud with its early (and surprising, given an unstable first few months) success. With declining ratings (probably due mainly to its overexposure and viewers subsequently tiring of the show), and as part of a scheduling reshuffle with two of ABC's half-hour soaps, the show moved back to the 11:30/10:30 timeslot in October 1984, as the second part of a one-hour game show block with Trivia Trap (later All-Star Blitz) as its lead-in, hoping to make a dent in the ratings of The Price Is Right, coincidentally another Goodson-packaged show.

Despite the ratings decline, there was some interest in keeping the show in production. In a 2010 interview, Dawson recalled a meeting with executives from Viacom about renewing the show for one more season after 1985. Dawson was growing tired of the grueling taping schedule and initially wanted to stop altogether. After discussing the situation with ABC and Viacom, Dawson said that he would return for a final syndicated season of thirty-nine weeks of episodes but would not continue doing the daytime series. After this, Dawson did not hear from Viacom for approximately a week and once they contacted him again, Dawson was told that Viacom was no longer interested in continuing the syndicated Feud beyond the 1984–85 season. Viacom made this official in January 1985 ahead of that year's NATPE convention, and within a few weeks, ABC, probably prompted by Viacom's decision, decided that it too would not renew Feud for the 1985–86 season. The daytime version came to an end on June 14, 1985. The final week was taped a month prior, on May 16. Newspapers via Associated Press reported that this version was slated to end on June 28. However, for reasons undisclosed, it ended two weeks prior to that instead. The syndicated version aired its last new episode on May 17, 1985, with reruns continuing to air until September 1986.

1988–1995 

Family Feud moved to CBS with Ray Combs hosting the show on July 4, 1988 at 10:00 a.m. (ET)/9:00 a.m. (CT/MT/PT), replacing The $25,000 Pyramid (which had aired continuously in that time slot since September 1982, except between January and April 1988, when Blackout took its place; CBS began development on Family Feud shortly after Blackout was canceled). Like its predecessor, this version also had an accompanying syndicated edition which launched in September of that year.

The CBS version started off with good ratings, particularly with women, but struggled to sustain that momentum. The changing landscape of daytime television, with most network affiliates pre-empting network shows in favor of syndicated programming, plus the decline of game shows as a genre at the time, began to hurt Feud, and many CBS affiliates dropped the program from their lineups. It moved to 10:30/9:30 in January 1991 to make room for a short-lived talk show starring Barbara De Angelis. At that time frame, it replaced the daytime Wheel of Fortune, which moved back to NBC after a two-year run on CBS hosted by Bob Goen but still featuring Vanna White.

In June 1992, the network version expanded from its original half-hour format to a full hour, and was retitled The Family Feud Challenge; this new format featured three families per episode, which included two new families competing in the first half-hour for the right to play the returning champions in the second half. Early into the fifth season, however, CBS announced it would no longer program the 10:00 a.m. ET timeslot starting in the fall of 1993, effectively cancelling Feud. The Family Feud Challenge aired its final new episode on March 26, 1993, with reruns airing until September 10 of that year.

The syndicated Feud, however, remained in production and entered its sixth season in the fall of 1993. The show, however, had dealt with a consistent ratings downturn for several years. It initially secured time frames in desirable hours, such as the Prime Time Access hour, but stations quickly found other programming, such as A Current Affair, Inside Edition and Hard Copy, intended to draw higher ratings, particularly among younger, more desirable viewers, and sought these shows to replace Feud. Some stations dropped the show, while others relocated it to lower-rated time frames such as late night and early morning slots. This resulted in Feud's ratings bottoming out in the 1992–93 season and its distributor, All American Television informed Mark Goodson Productions that unless there was an uptick in ratings or changes were made to the program, they would cancel it at the end of the 1993–94 season.

The responsibility for this was all in the hands of Jonathan Goodson, who had taken over his father's company when Mark Goodson died in 1992. One of the options considered was a host change, with original Feud host Richard Dawson’s name being repeatedly mentioned as an option. The consideration of Dawson as host was a reversal of policy, since Mark Goodson had refused to consider Dawson as host for the revival series and had remained loyal to Combs from the moment he hired him. There were also many staffers from the original series that were working on the revival, including executive producer Howard Felsher with whom Dawson had significant friction. As a result, there were many lingering bad feelings over Dawson’s behavior and there was relative unease over the idea of him returning to Feud.

Jonathan Goodson felt that a change was necessary in order to keep the show in production, so he contacted Dawson about returning. Dawson, who had largely retired from show business by 1993, agreed to terms on a contract and All-American Television decided to renew the syndicated Feud for at least one more year. Combs, who was upset over his firing, finished the remainder of the 1993–94 season as host with his final episodes taping in early 1994. After the last taping session concluded, Combs left the studio without saying goodbye to anyone.

A revamped Family Feud returned for a seventh season in September 1994, with Dawson returning as the host. The show expanded from thirty to sixty minutes, reinstated the Family Feud Challenge format, and did various other things to try to improve ratings such as modernizing the set, featuring families that had previously been champions on the original Feud, and having more themed weeks. Although Dawson did bring a brief ratings surge when he came back, the show could not sustain it long term and Feud came to a conclusion at the end of the season, with Dawson retiring permanently afterward. Its final new episode aired on May 26, 1995, with reruns airing until September 8 of that year and repeated failures to come to an agreement with various syndicators kept it off the air for nearly the next four years.

Outside of the show Ray Combs, whose life was falling apart due to financial ruin caused in large measure by the typecasting he incurred as host of Feud, never found other show-business employment and committed suicide on June 2, 1996 by hanging himself in a Glendale psychiatric ward.

1999–present 

Family Feud returned in syndication on September 20, 1999, with comedian Louie Anderson as the next host. Three years later, Richard Karn took over the show. The format was changed to reintroduce returning champions, allowing them to appear for up to five days. Anderson-hosted episodes continued in reruns that aired on PAX TV/Ion Television. Karn hosted the show for four years until he was replaced by John O'Hurley in 2006 and Steve Harvey in 2010.

The show's Nielsen ratings were at 1.5, putting it in danger of cancellation once again (as countless affiliates that carried the show from 1999 to 2010 aired it in daytime, graveyard or other low-rated time slots). Since Steve Harvey took over the show, ratings increased by as much as 40%, and within two short years, the show was rated at 4.0, and had become the fifth-most-popular syndicated program. Fox News' Paulette Cohn argued that Harvey's "relatability," or "understanding of what the people at home want to know," was what saved the show from cancellation; Harvey himself debated, "If someone said an answer that was so ridiculous, I knew that the people at home behind the camera had to be going, 'What did they just say?' … They gave this answer that doesn't have a shot in hell of being up there. The fact that I recognize that, that's comedic genius to me. I think that's [what made] the difference."

Steve Harvey's Family Feud has regularly ranked among the top 10 highest-rated programs in all of daytime television programming and third among game shows (behind Wheel of Fortune and Jeopardy!); in February 2014, the show achieved a 6.0 share in the Nielsen ratings, with approximately 8.8 million viewers. In June 2015, Family Feud eclipsed Wheel of Fortune, which had been on top for over 30 years, as the most-watched syndicated game show on television, and consistently began ranking among the top three shows in all of syndication. The show has had improved syndication clearances and better timeslots. It has been airing in early fringe and prime access slots nationwide.

Reruns of episodes hosted by Dawson, Combs, Anderson, and Karn have been included among Buzzr's acquisitions since its launch on June 1, 2015. In 2019, reruns of the Karn-hosted episodes started airing on Up TV during the morning hours.

Production of Family Feud was shifted from Universal Orlando to Harvey's hometown of Atlanta in 2011, first staged at the Atlanta Civic Center and later at the Georgia World Congress Center. Harvey was also originating a syndicated radio show from Atlanta, and the state of Georgia provided tax credits for the production. In 2017, production moved to Los Angeles Center Studios (later moved again to Universal Studios Hollywood and later still to CBS Studio Center) in Los Angeles to accommodate Harvey's new syndicated talk show Steve, returning production of the regular series to Los Angeles for the first time since 2010.

In November 2019, Harvey started production in South Africa for that country's version. It aired for the first time on Sunday, April 5, 2020. In conjunction, a website was launched, dedicated to the region to catch up on previous episodes, submit entries and engage from a local perspective.

In March 2020, after initially announcing that production would continue with no studio audience, Fremantle suspended production of all of its programs (including Family Feud) due to the onset of the COVID-19 pandemic. In August 2020, Family Feud returned to production, returning to Atlanta after several years in California and with health and safety protocols (including social distancing and no studio audience) being enforced. Since 2021, the series was filmed at Trilith Studios in Fayetteville, Georgia. In February 2023, the show was renewed for three more seasons through 2025–26.

Reception 
Family Feud won the Daytime Emmy Award for Outstanding Game/Audience Participation Show in 1977 and 2019, Outstanding Directing for a Game Show and the show has won the Daytime Emmy for Outstanding Game Show Host, once with Dawson in 1978 and thrice with Harvey in 2014, 2017 and 2022. Feud ranked number 3 on Game Show Network (GSN)'s 2006 list of the 50 Greatest Game Shows of All Time, and also on TV Guides 2013 list of the 60 greatest game shows ever.

Tara Ariano and Sarah D. Bunting, founders of the website Television Without Pity, wrote that they hated the 1999 syndicated version, saying "Give us classic Feud every time", citing both Dawson and Combs as hosts. Additionally, they called Anderson an "alleged sexual harasser and full-time sphere".

Since Harvey became host, the show has become notorious for questions and responses that are sexual in nature, with content frequently referring to certain anatomy or acts of intercourse. This type of material has drawn criticism from viewers, including former NCIS actress Pauley Perrette, who in 2018 sent a series of tweets to Family Feud producers questioning why the show had to be "so filthy." Dan Gainor of the Media Research Center, a politically conservative content analysis organization, suggested that the responses are in line with sexual content becoming more commonplace on television.

The popularity of Family Feud in the United States has led it to become a worldwide franchise, with over 50 adaptations outside the United States. Countries that have aired their own versions of the show include Australia, Canada, France, Germany, Indonesia, Japan, Malaysia, Mexico, the Netherlands, New Zealand, the Philippines, Poland, Russia, Thailand, the United Kingdom, South Africa, and Vietnam, among others.

Merchandise 

Since the show's premiere in 1976, many home versions of Family Feud have been released in various formats. Milton Bradley, Pressman Games, and Endless Games have all released traditional board games based on the show, while Imagination Entertainment released the program in a DVD game format.

The game has been released in other formats by multiple companies; Coleco Adam released the first computer version of the show in 1983, and Sharedata followed in 1987 with versions for MS-DOS, Commodore 64, and Apple II computers. GameTek released versions for Nintendo Entertainment System, Super NES, Genesis, 3DO, and PC (on CD-ROM) between 1990 and 1995. Hasbro Interactive released a version in 2000 for the PC and PlayStation. In 2006, versions were released for PlayStation 2, Game Boy Advance, and PC. Seattle-based Mobliss Inc. also released a mobile version of Family Feud that was available on Sprint, Verizon, and Cingular. Glu Mobile later released a newer mobile version of Family Feud for other carriers.

In conjunction with Ludia, Ubisoft has published Family Feud video games for multiple platforms. The first of these was entitled Family Feud: 2010 Edition and was released for the Wii, Nintendo DS, and PC in September 2009. Ubisoft then released Family Feud Decades the next year, which featured sets and survey questions from television versions of all four decades the show has been on air. A third game, entitled Family Feud: 2012 Edition was released for the Wii and Xbox 360 in 2011. A fourth game, produced by Ubisoft and developed by Snap Finger Click, was released for the PlayStation 4, Xbox One, Nintendo Switch, and Stadia in 2020.

In addition to the home games, a DVD set titled All-Star Family Feud starring Richard Dawson was released on January 8, 2008, by BCI Eclipse LLC Home Entertainment (under license from Fremantle USA) and featured a total of 43 segments taken from 21 special celebrity episodes from the original ABC/syndicated versions on its four discs, uncut and remastered from original 2” videotapes for optimal video presentation and sound quality. It was reissued as The Best of All-Star Family Feud on February 2, 2010.

International versions

See also 
 All Star Family Feud
 Family Fortunes
 Google Feud

References

Works cited

External links 
 
 Current Production website
 
 
 
 
 

 
1976 American television series debuts
1985 American television series endings
1988 American television series debuts
1995 American television series endings
1999 American television series debuts
1970s American game shows
1980s American game shows
1990s American game shows
2000s American game shows
2010s American game shows
2020s American game shows
American Broadcasting Company original programming
CBS original programming
English-language television shows
First-run syndicated television programs in the United States
Television series by CBS Studios
Television series by 20th Century Fox Television
Television series by Fremantle (company)
Television series by Lionsgate Television
Television series by Mark Goodson-Bill Todman Productions
Television series by Tribune Entertainment
Television productions suspended due to the COVID-19 pandemic
American television series revived after cancellation
American television spin-offs
Television series impacted by the COVID-19 pandemic